Zürich Enge railway station is a railway station on the S-Bahn Zürich system in the southwestern part, in the Enge quarter, of the Swiss city of Zürich. The station is located on the Lake Zürich left bank line, although since 2003 it is bypassed by the alternative Zimmerberg Base Tunnel routing.

Although now largely confined to serving suburban trains (S-Bahn), the station has a particularly imposing semicircular facade. It is inscribed on the Swiss Inventory of Cultural Property of National Significance.

History 
The first Enge station opened in 1875 with the opening of the Lake Zürich left bank line. The line's original routing through the area differed from the current alignment and was largely at street level, with many level crossings.

The current station was built between 1925 and 1927, when the line was rerouted to the west, using a lower level alignment with more tunneling. The station building is constructed of granite from the Ticino, which fact is marked by the naming of the frontal square as Tessinerplatz. The architects were the brothers Otto Pfister and Werner Pfister, who modelled the station frontage on that of Stuttgart Hauptbahnhof.

Currently, Enge station has two tracks. Originally, the station had three tracks, which carried all the traffic on both the Lake Zurich left bank line and the Zürich to Lucerne main line. These tracks were served by a side platform to the east and an island platform between the two westernmost tracks. With the opening of the alternative Zimmerberg Base Tunnel routing in 2002, most long-distance trains no longer pass through or stop at Enge station. As a consequence, the westernmost track was removed and the island platform converted to a side platform.

Operation 
The rail approaches to the station from both north and south are by tunnel, with the tunnel mouths at the end of the platforms.

Services

Train 
The station is served by lines S2, S8, and S24 of the Zürich S-Bahn:

During weekends, there is a nighttime S-Bahn service (SN8) offered by ZVV:

Tram/Bus 
There is a tram stop, called Bahnhof Enge, right in front of the reception building at Tessinerplatz. Another nearby stop is Bhf. Enge/Bederstrasse, where connections to both trams and buses exist. Zürich tram routes 5, 6 and 7 stop at Bahnhof Enge (Tessinerplatz), while Bhf. Enge/Bederstrasse is served by tram lines 5, 13 and 17, and bus routes 66, 200, 210, 444 and 445.

Summary of tram and bus services:
Bhf.

Gallery

References

External links 

 
Interactive station plan (Zürich Enge)
Zurich Enge station plan

Cultural property of national significance in the canton of Zürich
Enge
Swiss Federal Railways stations
Railway stations in Switzerland opened in 1875